Richard John Lucas (born 22 January 1948) is an English retired professional footballer who played  for Oxford United, Kettering Town and Aylesbury United.

Playing career
Born in Witney in 1948, Dick played his first game for Oxford United 'A' in January 1963, before signing his first professional contract in 1965. Dick played in 8 seasons for United, making a total of 219 appearances in all competitions, including 4 goals. A long term ankle injury ended his Football League career, with a move to Kettering Town following. Dick finished his playing career with a short spell at Aylesbury United, between 1978 and 1979.

Career statistics

Honours
Oxford United
 Football League
Third Division: Champions 1967–68

References
General
 

Specific

1948 births
English footballers
Oxford United F.C. players
Kettering Town F.C. players
Aylesbury United F.C. players
Living people
Association football defenders